Cabot is the largest city in Lonoke County, Arkansas, United States, and a suburb of Little Rock. As of the 2010 census, the population of the city was 23,776, and in 2019 the population was an estimated 26,352, ranking it as the state's 19th largest city, behind Jacksonville. It is part of the Little Rock–North Little Rock–Conway Metropolitan Statistical Area.

History

Prior to settlement 
Before the city of Cabot existed, an 1862 typhoid epidemic took the lives of about 1,500 Confederate soldiers previously under Allison Nelson who were camped in the hills surrounding Cabot and its neighbor, Austin. In 1905, 428 poorly marked graves were exhumed by a group of Confederate veterans and moved to a new site at Camp Nelson Confederate Cemetery located in Cabot on Rye Drive, just off Cherry Road between Campground and Mount Carmel roads. Marble gravestones were placed over each grave and a large marble obelisk was erected to honor the dead. In 1982, a group of volunteers from Cabot began maintaining the cemetery, which had fallen into disrepair.

Early history 
The city of Cabot began as a small settlement at a refueling station on the Cairo & Fulton Railroad. The settlement first appeared in 1873 and is thought to have been named after a railroad surveyor. First Baptist Church was established in 1876, and the Bank of Cabot (later merged into Centennial Bank) was founded in 1903. The city of Cabot was officially incorporated November 9, 1891, as the 139th city in Arkansas.

Cabot was often overshadowed in northern Lonoke County by what at the time was the much larger city of Austin (originally named Oakland), which was briefly considered for the state capital. However, Cabot experienced growth during the 1950s and 1960s, due to its proximity to the Little Rock Air Force Base in nearby Jacksonville which opened in 1955.

Major transportation routes near/through Cabot are the railroad (currently owned by Union Pacific), the "old highway to St. Louis" (currently Arkansas Highway 367), and US Highway 67/167. Historically, Cabot lay on the Memphis to Fort Smith spur of the Butterfield Overland Stagecoach Route.

Recent history 

A devastating tornado hit downtown Cabot during the afternoon of March 29, 1976, killing five people and destroying multiple buildings. During the rebuilding of the city, it was decided to build a new city hall, municipal courtroom, library (since relocated), and police station on the site of the debris-filled dividing point between the east and west sections of Main Street, creating City Plaza. Arkansas Highway 89, which follows the same path as West Main Street in Cabot, was redirected around City Plaza along one block of Second Street, to continue its path along Pine Street just south of the Cabot High School campus.

Cabot's population has more than quintupled from the 1980s to today. New housing starts, as seen by new subdivided developments, now cover the town.

On August 10, 2006, Cabot Junior High School North experienced a devastating fire which was believed to have started as a small electrical fire in the library caused by a faulty light bulb. Although there were 100 people in the building at the time, there were no injuries. The building burned from 2:30 p.m. to about 9:00 p.m., and the structure was a total loss. Cabot Fire and Police Departments say that this is one of the worst structure fires to have ever occurred in Cabot. The school was only about eight years old. It was rebuilt and reopened about three years later.

Geography
Cabot is in northwestern Lonoke County and is bordered to the northeast by the city of Austin. U.S. Routes 67 and 167 pass through the northwest side of the city on a four-lane freeway, leading northeast  to Searcy and southwest  to Little Rock, the state capital.

Climate
The climate in this area is characterized by hot, humid summers and generally mild to cool winters.  According to the Köppen Climate Classification system, Cabot has a humid subtropical climate, abbreviated "Cfa" on climate maps.

Demographics

2020 census

As of the 2020 United States census, there were 26,569 people, 9,780 households, and 6,967 families residing in the city.

2010 census
As of the census of 2010, there were 23,776 people, 5,432 households, and 4,329 families residing in the city. The most recent United States Census Bureau estimates available (from July 2014) indicate the city's population at 25,627. The racial makeup of the city was 96.56% White, 0.33% Black or African American, 0.40% Native American, 0.88% Asian, 0.04% Pacific Islander, 0.49% from other races, and 1.30% from two or more races. 1.87% of the population were Hispanic or Latino of any race.

There were 5,432 households, out of which 47.1% had children under the age of 18 living with them, 65.7% were married couples living together, 10.7% had a female householder with no husband present, and 20.3% were non-families. 17.2% of all households were made up of individuals, and 5.8% had someone living alone who was 65 years of age or older. The average household size was 2.78 and the average family size was 3.14.

In the city, the population was spread out, with 31.5% under the age of 18, 7.6% from 18 to 24, 34.0% from 25 to 44, 19.0% from 45 to 64, and 7.9% who were 65 years of age or older. The median age was 32 years. For every 100 females, there were 95.8 males. For every 100 females age 18 and over, there were 89.9 males.

The median income for a household in the city was $49,389, and the median income for a family was $53,933. Males had a median income of $37,450 versus $26,209 for females. The per capita income for the city was $19,020. About 5.6% of families and 7.1% of the population were below the poverty line, including 7.9% of those under age 18 and 10.4% of those age 65 or over.

Bedroom community / Commuter culture 

In 1972, the Little Rock School District, slow to comply with the 1954 US Supreme Court case Brown v. Topeka Board of Education, was forcibly ordered by federal courts to immediately desegregate the school district. As a result, tensions rose and during the 1980s and 1990s Little Rock school district teachers repeatedly went on strike. Many residents chose to relocate to smaller communities around Little Rock, including Cabot, Benton, Bryant, Conway, and Maumelle. Over time, new arrivals to the state chose to live in these towns (now veritable suburbs) because, by some educational indicators, the school districts were more successful.

Cabot received many of the families that were relocating during that time period. As a result, a "commuter culture" developed because many residents, that had children in Cabot schools, made the commute to Little Rock to work. As more people moved to Cabot to join the Cabot Commuter Culture, the tax base grew and as a result The Cabot School District steadily developed into one of the top-performing districts in the state.

Critics of Cabot's growth, such as the Little Rock-based newspaper Arkansas Times, accused these residents of "white flight", and of simply giving up on an integrated Little Rock school district. Currently, the Cabot School District encompasses the north end of Lonoke County. The bulk of the county's population today can be found in approximately the same area, containing the county's most populous and second most populous cities — Cabot and Ward, respectively — in addition to Austin, which are among Arkansas' fastest growing communities.

Culture 
Cabot has a movie theater that was built in the late 1990s, plus a growing number of restaurants, amateur sporting venues and community organizations. A new multimillion-dollar library/public meeting complex was completed and opened in 2015. The city has golf courses adjoining Greystone Country Club in the city's north end, and near Rolling Hills Country Club in southeast Cabot. Both of the country clubs and the Veterans of Foreign Wars post are exceptions to Cabot's legal status as part of a dry county, which prohibits the sale of alcoholic beverages elsewhere in the city.

One of the city's biggest events, staged in the downtown area each October, is Cabotfest — a community fair that has grown in popularity as the city's population has swelled over the years since the tornado. A similar event called Strawberry Fest is held annually in the spring.  Cabot is part of the small area in Arkansas along highway 67/167 where strawberries were grown in abundance and sold in other parts of the country during the early part of the 20th Century due in large part to the arrival of the railroad. 

Adam Richman, the host of Man vs. Food on the Travel Channel, came to Cabot's Mean Pig BBQ during the Season 2 "Little Rock" episode which aired on November 25, 2009 to try the Shut-Up Juice Challenge, which involves a large smoked pulled pork sandwich topped with coleslaw and "Shut-Up Juice" - barbecue sauce mixed with a tablespoon of concentrated, undiluted habanero extract.

There are 40 churches in Cabot. This gives the city a person to church ratio of 640 people per church.

Education

Cabot Public Schools serves students in the communities of Cabot, Austin, and Ward, as well as most of northern Lonoke County.

Notable events at the school district's campuses each year include a regional music student competition, a student musical theater production, and a community beauty pageant. The Cabot High School Band is currently directed by Rusty Hart and, with over 300 students, is the largest high school band in the State of Arkansas. The band participates in many competitions, including the local Region VII and State competitions. The band has also recently been placed in a three-year rotation to represent the State of Arkansas in the National Independence Day Parade in Washington, D.C.

The choral program at Cabot High has consistently received high marks in regional and state competitions. Awards have been given at All-Region Invitations, Contest, State Choral Performance Assessment, and the Lonoke County and Arkansas State Fairs.

The Forensics and Debate Department is run by Jennifer Akers. The program competes at tournaments around the state, in events ranging from duet improvisation, to extemporaneous speaking and debate. They also participate in group events including words and music, and reader's theater.

Cabot High School has completed a remodeling process which includes a new fine arts center, designed with the input from the directors of the band, choir, theater, forensics, and art programs.

The school football team won the AAA state championship in 1983 and the AAAAA state championship in 2000 under head coach Mike Malham, who was a draft pick for the Chicago Bears in 1976. In 2005, a new three story athletic complex was completed which contains an indoor practice field, weight room, and locker room, and athletic department offices. Also in the building is a live TV production studio in which students from the Cabot Broadcasting program film football games and transmit video onto the 12-foot by 12-foot Jumbotron outside.

Notable people
Terri Utley, Miss Arkansas USA 1982, Miss USA 1982
Bryce Mitchell, UFC fighter
Eddie Joe Williams, current member of the Southern States Energy Board, former mayor of Cabot, former state senator for District 29 and Senate Majority Leader
Cody Wilson, crypto-anarchist, founder of Defense Distributed and inventor of the first 3D-printable gun

References

External links

 Official website
 "Cabot (Lonoke County)", Encyclopedia of Arkansas History & Culture
 VisitCabot.com

 
Cities in Arkansas
Cities in Lonoke County, Arkansas
Populated places established in 1873
Cities in Little Rock–North Little Rock–Conway metropolitan area